Russia participated in the Junior Eurovision Song Contest 2012 in Amsterdam, Netherlands. The Russian entry was selected through a national final, organised by Russian broadcaster All-Russia State Television and Radio Company (VGTRK). The final was held on 3 June 2012. Valeriya Engalycheva and her song "Sensatsiya" won the national final, getting 12.34% of votes.

Before Junior Eurovision

National final 
On 1 March 2012, VGTRK announced that a national final would be held to select Russia' entry for the Junior Eurovision Song Contest 2012. A submission period for interested artists was opened and lasted until 1 May 2012. A professional jury selected twenty artists and songs from the applicants to proceed to the televised national final. The selected artists and songs competed at the national final which took place on 3 June 2012 at the "Akademichesky" concert hall in Moscow, hosted by Dmitry Guberniev and Oksana Fedorova. The winner was determined by a 50/50 combination of jury voting and televoting. The members of the jury were Yury Entin, Maksim Dunayevsky, Gennady Gokhstein, Grygory Gladkov, Larisa Rubalskaya and Alexander Igudin. In addition to the performances from the competitors, the show featured guest performances by Buranovskiye Babushki, Katya Ryabova and Erik Rapp.

At Junior Eurovision 

During the allocation draw on 15 October 2012, Russia was drawn to perform 5th, following Belgium and preceding Israel. Russia placed 4th, scoring 88 points.

In Russia, show were broadcast on Russia-1 with commentary by Olga Shelest. The Russian spokesperson revealing the result of the Russian vote was Valentin Sadiki.

Voting

Notes

References

Junior Eurovision Song Contest
Russia
2012